"Slipping Away" is a song by American electronic musician Moby. It was released as the sixth and final single from his seventh studio album Hotel on January 23, 2006. It served as the fourth single from Hotel in the United Kingdom, where it peaked at number 53 on the UK Singles Chart, and as the sixth international single from the album. The single version features British singer-songwriter Alison Moyet on backing vocals.

Moby also recorded two alternate versions of the song, which were later released as singles: "Escapar (Slipping Away)" with Spanish rock band Amaral, which reached number three in Spain, and "Slipping Away (Crier la vie)" with French recording artist Mylène Farmer, which topped the charts in France and Belgium.

Track listing

Charts

Weekly charts

Year-end charts

Moby and Amaral version 

The release of Hotel in some Spanish speaking countries included a full-Spanish version called "Escapar (Slipping Away)" with the Spanish rock band Amaral. The song peaked at number three in Spain.

Track listing

Charts

Moby and Mylène Farmer version

Background and release 
In June 2006, a rumor was launched that Mylène Farmer would record a duet with an international star. Several artists were mentioned, such as Lara Fabian, Benjamin Biolay, Diam's, or Madonna, but especially Robbie Williams who had apparently declared at the 2002 NRJ Music Awards that he would like to work with her. Then the name of Moby was suggested because a possible collaboration with Mylène Farmer had been mentioned in the past by Moby himself. In late August, the purchase order and Moby's official website indicated that the name of the song was "Slipping Away (Crier la vie)".

Produced and remixed by MHC in London, "Slipping Away (Crier la vie)" is a dance version of "Slipping Away" adds French lyrics. On his blog on September 9, 2006, then in the December 16, 2006 edition of the French newspaper Le Parisien, Moby stated that Farmer came to his restaurant Teany in New York and suggested to him that they record a duet version of "Slipping Away", as she had heard the song on his best of and liked it. He explained that she wrote her lyrics in French and they worked together at a distance from each other (New York and Paris).

The song was very regularly aired by all French radio stations, including Fun Radio which aired it several times every day. As the song was very successful, new remixes were made and a second CD maxi and vinyl were released on November 15.

Farmer's 2008 album Point de Suture contains another duet with Moby called "Looking for My Name", which was recorded just after "Slipping Away (Crier la vie)".

Music video 

On September 15, 2006, the website Yahoo! presented the video in preview and five days later, it was broadcast for the first time on the French television channels. On September 23, a TV promo campaign began and the video was aired every hour on the day of the single's release on Europe 2 TV. The video, directed by Hugo Ramirez and available on a track of the CD maxi, is almost the same as that of the original version and is composed of a series of photos representing various events in the United States during the 20th century, plus some new photos (Moby and Farmer when they were babies). The song's lyrics are written in these images.

Live performances
The song was performed for the first time on the Timeless Tour in 2013, including a virtual duet with Moby.

Chart performance 

The single debuted at number one on the French SNEP Singles Chart on September 30, with 26,019 units. The single remained for 11 weeks in the top ten, 22 weeks in the top 50 and 37 weeks in the top 100. It became Moby's first number one in France and Farmer's fourth, after "Pourvu qu'elles soient douces", "Désenchantée", and "XXL". It was also the single with longest chart trajectory in France for both artists. The song also peaked at number one on French Digital Download Chart and performed well on various airplay charts. On the 2006 Annual Charts, the song ranked at number 22 (physical sales) and number 51 (digital download).

The song was heavily aired on radio: it peaked at number two on the French Airplay Chart, number three on the Power 70 Airplay Chart, number two on the television Airplay Chart, and number 29 on the Club Chart.

Formats and track listings 
 CD

 7" vinyl

Official versions

Credits and personnel 

The credits and the personnel as they appear on the back of the single:

 Moby – lyrics, vocals, instruments, engineering of the original version
 Mylène Farmer – lyrics, vocals
 Manhattan Clique – production
 Brian Sperber – engineering of the original version
 Little Idiot Music / Warner Tamerlane Publishing (BMI) / Requiem Publishing – editions

 Jérôme Devoise – recording of Mylène Farmer's vocals
 Paul Van Parys for Stuffed Monkey – vocal production
 Drew Griffiths at Titanium Studio, London – Mylène Farmer vocal mixing
 TS3 / Thierry Suc – Mylène Farmer management

Charts

Weekly charts

Year-end charts

Certifications

References

Notes

External links 
 "Slipping Away (Crier la vie)" at Mylene.net 

2005 songs
2006 singles
Moby songs
Mylène Farmer songs
Songs written by Moby
Songs with lyrics by Mylène Farmer
Ultratop 50 Singles (Wallonia) number-one singles
SNEP Top Singles number-one singles
Macaronic songs
Male–female vocal duets
Mute Records singles